J&L Supply Co. Ltd. is an oil supply company based in Canada founded over 30 years ago. The company is now known as the largest supplier of oil well drill bits in Canada. 

The company is headquartered in Calgary, Alberta and employs more than 41 people.

See also 
 List of oilfield service companies

References

External links

Companies based in Calgary
Oil companies of Canada
Oilfield services companies